The Mexican state of Nuevo León held an election on Sunday, 6 July 2003. At stake was the office of the Nuevo León State Governor, and all 42 members of the unicameral Nuevo León State Congress, and 51 mayors and municipal councils.

Governor

Executive power rests in a governor, who is directly elected by the citizens, using a secret ballot, to a six-year term with no possibility of reelection. The position is open only to a Mexican citizen by birth, at least 30 years old with at least five years residency in Nuevo León.

The victorious candidate in this election was  José Natividad González Parás, representing an alliance of the Institutional Revolutionary Party (PRI) and the Green Ecological Party (PVEM).
This was a major victory for the PRI, since the highly industrialised state of Nuevo León had previously been governed by the PAN and was generally considered a solid PAN state.

González Parás took office on October 4, 2003 for a term that will end on October 4, 2009.

State congress

Legislative power in the state rests in a unicameral legislature composed of 42 deputies, also elected via secret ballot by the citizenry, 26 of whom are directly elected and 16 chosen according to a plurinominal system involving proportional representation. Following the election, the 70th Legislature consists of 23 PRI deputies, 11 from PAN, 3 from PT, 3 from PVEM, 1 from PRD, and one independent.

See also
Governors of Nuevo León
Politics and government of Nuevo León
List of political parties in Mexico

2003 elections in Mexico
Nuevo León elections
July 2003 events in Mexico